IDDM may refer to:

 Insulin-dependent diabetes mellitus, now known as diabetes mellitus type 1, an autoimmune disease resulting in the destruction of insulin-producing cells.  The term insulin-dependent diabetes mellitus is still widely used in Japan.
 Integrated diver display mask, an item of scuba gear.